Bearhouse Township is a township in Drew County, Arkansas, United States. Its total population was 38 as of the 2010 United States Census, an increase of 15.15 percent from 33 at the 2000 census.

According to the 2010 Census, Bearhouse Township is located at  (33.454555, -91.696699).

References

External links 

Townships in Arkansas
Populated places in Drew County, Arkansas